Enneatypus is a genus of flowering plants belonging to the family Polygonaceae.

Its native range is Trinidad to Southern Tropical America.

Species:

Enneatypus ramiflorus 
Enneatypus tenuiflorus

References

Polygonaceae
Polygonaceae genera